Jina and Jinah are Roman-alphabet spellings of either of two homophonous Korean feminine given names with different hangul spellings. The meaning differs based on the hanja used to write each syllable of the name.

For the name systemically transcribed as Jin-a. there are 48 hanja with the reading "jin" and 20 hanja with the reading "a" on the South Korean government's official list of hanja which may be used in given names. People with this name include:

Shim Yi-young (born Kim Jin-ah, 1980), South Korean actress
Kang Jin-a (born 1981), South Korean film director
Lee Jin-a (born 1985), South Korean tennis player
Nana (singer) (born Im Jin-ah, 1991), South Korean singer, member of girl group After School
Lee Jin-ah (born 1991), South Korean singer signed to Antenna Music
Kwon Jin-ah (born 1997), South Korean singer and guitarist

For the name systemically transcribed as Ji-na, there are 46 hanja with the reading "ji" and 16 hanja with the reading "na" on the South Korean government's official list of hanja which may be used in given names. People with this name include:
Song Ji-na (born 1959), South Korean screenwriter
Choi Ji-na (born 1975), South Korean actress
G.NA, stage name of Gina Jane Choi (born 1987), Korean Canadian singer
Kim Ji-na, South Korean missionary taken hostage in Afghanistan in 2007

See also
List of Korean given names

References

Korean feminine given names